Paphies ventricosa, or toheroa (a Māori word meaning "long tongue"), is a large bivalve mollusc of the family Mesodesmatidae, endemic to New Zealand.

Distribution
It is found in both the North and South Islands, but the main habitat is the west coast of the North Island. The best grounds are wide fine-sand beaches where there are extensive sand-dunes, enclosing freshwater, which percolates to the sea, there promoting the growth of diatoms and plankton.

Description

The toheroa is a very large shellfish with a solid white, elongated shell with the apex at the middle. Maximum length is 117 mm, height 81 mm, and thickness 38 mm.

Human use
The toheroa has long been a popular seafood, often made into a greenish soup, for which it has an international reputation. 

Toheroa were translocated across New Zealand by Māori using  (kelp bags) made from southern bull kelp (Durvillaea poha).

It was over-exploited in the 1950s and 1960s, and there has been a ban on harvesting (except for limited customary purposes) since 1979. However, numbers have not recovered since 1979, due to illegal poaching, poorly policed customary harvesting, vehicle driving on beaches, pollution, reduction in fresh water coming onto beaches, and gas bubble disease.

References

 Checklist of New Zealand Mollusca
 Powell A. W. B., New Zealand Mollusca, William Collins Publishers Ltd, Auckland, New Zealand 1979 

Commercial molluscs
Bivalves of New Zealand
Mesodesmatidae
Bivalves described in 1790
Taxa named by Johann Friedrich Gmelin